Omega Aurigae, Latinized from ω  Aurigae, is the Bayer designation for a double star in the northern constellation of Auriga. Its apparent magnitude is 4.95, which is bright enough to be seen with the naked eye. The system is a member of the Columba group of co-moving stars.

This is an A-type main sequence star with a stellar classification of A1 V. It is 317 million years old with a high rate of spin, showing a projected rotational velocity of 107 km/s. The star has 2.3 times the mass of the Sun and double the Sun's radius. It has a magnitude 8.18 companion at an angular separation of 4.99 arcseconds.

References

External links
 HR 1592
 Image Omega Aurigae
 CCDM J04593+3753

A-type main-sequence stars
Circumstellar disks
Double stars

Auriga (constellation)
Aurigae, Omega
BD+37 1005
Aurigae, 04
031647
023179
1592